Piro Sports is a German auto racing team based in Heusweiler, Germany. The team currently participates in the ADAC GT4 Germany after previously competed in single-make touring car series and junior formula racing such as ADAC Formula 4 and Formula Renault 1.6 NEC Junior.

History 
The team was founded by hillclimb racing driver Erwin Piro in 1998 to compete in the Ford Puma Cup. Between 2000 and 2004 the team competed in the Alfa Romeo 147 Cup and in the MINI Challenge between 2005 and 2012.

Junior formula racing

In 2014 the team made a switch to single seaters entering the Formula Renault 1.6 NEC Junior for Erwin Piro's son Cedric Piro and Larry ten Voorde. The drivers finished 8th (Piro) and 10th (ten Voorde). The team entered the inaugural ADAC Formula 4 season for Piro and Toni Wolf. Wolf finished the season in 22nd position while Piro finished 24th. For 2016 the team entered a single car for Piro at selected races finishing again 24th. The team returned again with Piro in 2017 and adding a second car Doureid Ghattas. Piro finished the season 20th while Ghattas finished 26th without scoring points.

TCR Europe Series  
Piro Sports made a return to touring cars by entering in the TCR Europe Series under the Autodis Racing by Piro Sports under Luxembourg racing license. The team entered two cars - Honda Civic Type R TCR (FK8) for Cedric Piro and Hyundai i30 N TCR for Loris Cencetti.

Former Series results

ADAC Formula 4

Timeline

References

External links 

 Official website

German auto racing teams
Auto racing teams established in 1998
Formula Renault teams